Victor Palciauskas (born Vytautas Palčiauskas; October 3, 1941 in Kaunas) is a Lithuania-born American chess player who holds the chess title of International Correspondence Chess Grandmaster. He was the tenth World Correspondence Chess Champion (1978–1984).

Palciauskas tied for second place (undefeated 5/8, +2 −0 =6) behind Mikhail Umansky in a "champion of champions" tournament, the ICCF 50 Years World Champion Jubilee. This was a special invitational correspondence tournament involving all living former ICCF World Champions.

Palciauskas received his doctorate in physics in 1969, and became a professor of physics in California.

References

External links
 
 
 
 

1941 births
Living people
Lithuanian chess players
American chess players
Correspondence chess grandmasters
World Correspondence Chess Champions
Sportspeople from Kaunas
Soviet emigrants to the United States